Sulzberger (German: habitational name for someone from a place called Sulzberg) is a surname. Notable people with the surname include:

 Arthur Hays Sulzberger (1891–1968), publisher of The New York Times from 1935 to 1961
 Arthur Ochs Sulzberger (1926–2012), publisher of The New York Times from 1963 to 1992
 Arthur Ochs Sulzberger Jr. (born 1951), publisher of The New York Times from 1992 to 2017
 Arthur Gregg Sulzberger (born 1980), publisher of The New York Times since 2018
 Mayer Sulzberger (1843-1923), American judge and Jewish communal leader 
 Cyrus Leopold Sulzberger (1858-1932), American merchant and philanthropist
 Cyrus Leo Sulzberger II (1912–1993), American journalist, diarist, and non-fiction writer
 Marcel Sulzberger (1876–1941), Swiss composer, pianist and music author
 Myron Sulzberger (1878–1956), American lawyer, politician, and judge

German toponymic surnames
German-language surnames